Trevor Nevitt Dupuy (May 3, 1916 – June 5, 1995) was a colonel in the United States Army and a noted military historian.

Early life
Born in Staten Island, New York, the son of accomplished illustrator and artist, Laura Nevitt Dupuy, and noted military historian, R. Ernest Dupuy, Trevor Dupuy followed in his father's footsteps.

Military career
Dupuy attended West Point, graduating in the class of 1938. During World War II he commanded a U.S. Army artillery battalion, a Chinese artillery group, and an artillery detachment from the British 36th Infantry Division. He was always proud of the fact that he had more combat time in Burma than any other American, and received decorations for service or valour from the U.S., British, and Chinese governments. After the war Dupuy served in the United States Department of Defense Operations Division from 1945 to 1947, and as military assistant to the Under Secretary of the Army from 1947 to 1948. He was a member of the original Supreme Headquarters Allied Powers Europe (SHAPE) staff in Paris under Generals Dwight D. Eisenhower and Matthew Ridgway from 1950 to 1952.

Dupuy went on to achieve eminence as a military historian and theorist. He is perhaps best known for his very large book The Encyclopedia Of Military History (co-written, like many of his books, with his father R. Ernest Dupuy). In this work Dupuy discusses the world's major and minor military conflicts from the dawn of history to the present day. Entries are arranged chronologically and by region, and most of them give little more than the names of the commanders and (often) very rough estimates for the size of the forces involved in the campaigns. Dupuy was not afraid of expressing an opinion and he classified some of his subjects as Great Captains (such as Alexander the Great, Hannibal, Julius Caesar, Gustavus Adolphus of Sweden, Viscount of Turenne, Frederick II of Prussia and Napoleon). The book mainly describes American and Western European conflicts but offers some coverage of other regions of the world.

The Encyclopedia Of Military History has been revised (and updated) several times, most recently in 1993. It can be found in the reference section of most American libraries.

Academic and research career
After Dupuy left active service in the Army in 1952, Harvard University appointed him as a Professor of Military Science and Tactics, where he helped found the Harvard Defense Studies Program (directed from 1958 to 1971 by Henry Kissinger). He left Harvard in 1956 to become director of the program in military studies at Ohio State University. After retiring from active military duty in 1958, he served as a visiting professor in the International Relations Program at Rangoon University (now Yangon University) in Burma. From 1960 to 1962 Dupuy worked for the Institute for Defense Analyses, a government-funded think tank.

In 1962 he formed the first of his research companies dedicated to the study and analysis of armed conflict, the Historical Evaluation and Research Organization (HERO), and served as President and Executive Director until 1983. From 1967 to 1983 he was also President of T. N. Dupuy Associates Inc. (TNDA), which became the parent organization for HERO. In 1983, TNDA sold its assets (including HERO) to a new corporation he formed called Data Memory Systems, Inc. (DMSI). Trevor was the president and largest stockholder in DMSI. In 1990, Dupuy resigned from DMSI, sold his stock and reactivated TNDA. In 1992 TNDA was closed out, and he established the non-profit The Dupuy Institute (TDI).

Dupuy's main contribution to military operation analysis is the assessment method Quantified Judgment Method or QJM, where the outcome of a battle is predicted using a fairly complicated multiplicative-additive formula in which various factors relating to the strength and firepower of the fighting parties as well as the circumstances are taken into account. Dupuy and his associates adjusted the parameters of his model by using known statistical facts of several recorded battles.

Family life and death
Dupuy killed himself by gunshot at his home in Vienna, Virginia on June 5, 1995; he had learned three weeks earlier that he had terminal pancreatic cancer. He was buried in Arlington National Cemetery.  During his lifetime he wrote or co-wrote more than 50 books.

When he died, he had been married five times. He fathered nine children – six boys and three girls.

Books and publications
 To the Colors: The Way of Life of an Army Officer (with R.E. Dupuy), Chicago, 1942
 Faithful and True: History of the 5th Field Artillery, Schwabisch-Hall, Germany, 1949
Campaigns of the French Revolution and of Napoleon, Cambridge, Ma, 1956
 Brave Men and Great Captains (With R. E. Dupuy), New York, 1960, 1984, 1993
 Compact History of the Civil War (with R.E. Dupuy), New York, 1960, 1991
 Civil War Land Battles, New York, 1960
 Civil War Naval Actions, New York, 1961
Military History Of World War II, New York, 1962–65 (in 18 fairly short books):

Compact History of the Revolutionary War (With R. E. Dupuy), New York, 1963
Holidays, Editor, Contributor., New York, 1965
Military Heritage Of America (With R. E. Dupuy, Paul Braim), 2 Vols., New York, 1966, 1986, 1992
Summation: Strategic and Combat Leadership, New York, 1967
Military History Of World War I, New York, 1967  (in 12 fairly short books):
 

The Battle Of Austerlitz, New York, 1968
Modern Libraries For Modern Colleges: Research Strategies For Design And Development, Washington, D.C., 1968
Ferment In College Libraries: The Impact Of Information Technology, Washington, D.C., 1968
Mediapower: A College Plans For An Integrated Media Service System, Washington, D.C., 1968
Military History Of The Chinese Civil War, New York, 1969
The Military Lives Series (published in 1969 and 1970) :

 Revolutionary War Naval Battles (With Grace P. Hayes), New York, 1970
 Revolutionary War Land Battles (With Gay M. Hammerman), New York, 1970
 Mongolia, Foreign Area Studies Handbook, Washington, D.C., 1970
 Almanac Of World Military Power 1970 (With John A. Andrews, Grace P. Hayes), New York, 1970
 Almanac Of World Military Power 1972 (With John A. Andrews, Grace P. Hayes), New York, 1972
 Documentary History Of Arms Control And Disarmament (With Gay M. Hammerman), New York, 1974
 World Military Leaders (With Grace P. Hayes, Paul Martell), 1974
 Almanac Of World Military Power 1974 (With John A. Andrews, Grace P. Hayes), New York, 1974
 People And Events Of The American Revolution (With Gay M. Hammerman), New York, 1974
 An Outline History Of The American Revolution (With R.E. Dupuy), New York, 1975
 Encyclopedia Of Military History (With R.E. Dupuy), New York, 1975, 1986, 1993
 A Genius For War: The German Army And General Staff, 1807–1945, New Jersey, 1977, 1984, 1989, 1993
 Numbers, Predictions and War, New York, 1978, 1985
 Elusive Victory: The Arab-Israeli Wars, 1947–1974, New York, 1978, 1984, 1989, 1992
 Almanac Of World Military Power 1980 (With John A. Andrews, Grace P. Hayes), New York, 1980
 The Evolution Of Weapons And Warfare, New York, 1980, 1984, 1986
 Great Battles Of The Eastern Front (With Paul Martell), New York, 1982
 Options Of Command, New York, 1984
 Flawed Victory: The Arab-Israeli Conflict And The 1982 War In Lebanon (With Paul Martell), Virginia, 1986
 Understanding War: Military History And The Theory Of Combat, New York, 1986
 Dictionary Of Military Terms (With Curt Johnson, Grace P. Hayes), New York, 1987
 Understanding Defeat: How to Recover from Loss in Battle to Gain Victory in War, New York, 1990  
 Attrition: Forecasting Battle Casualties And Equipment Losses In Modern War, Virginia, 1990  
 If War Comes, How To Defeat Saddam Hussein, Virginia, 1991; issued as a paperback with the title How To Defeat Saddam Hussein  
 Future Wars: The World's Most Dangerous Flashpoints, New York, 1992  
 Encyclopedia Of Military Biography (With Curt Johnson, David L. Bongard), New York, 1992  
 International Military And Defense Encyclopedia, (Brassey's) 6 Vols., Editor In Chief, New York, 1992
 Hitler's Last Gamble (With David L. Bongard, Richard C. Anderson), New York, 1994  
 Unpublished Manuscripts By Trevor N. Dupuy
 Great Captains And Modern War
 Military Myths (Unfinished)
 Documentary History Of The U.S. Armed Forces (Unfinished)

Notes

External links

Trevor N. Dupuy Institute

1916 births
1995 suicides
United States Army colonels
People from Staten Island
People from Vienna, Virginia
American military historians
United States Military Academy alumni
Burials at Arlington National Cemetery
American military writers
20th-century American historians
Academic staff of the University of Yangon
Suicides by firearm in Virginia
20th-century American male writers
American male non-fiction writers
Historians from New York (state)
Historians from Virginia
United States Army personnel of World War II
1995 deaths